The Arco 33 is an American sailboat that was designed by Wirth Munroe as a cruiser and first built in 1958. The design is noted as one of the first fiberglass production sailboats of its size built.

Production
The design was built by Crystaliners Corporation (Glassco Inc.) in Miami, Florida, United States. The company completed 15 boats starting in 1958, but it is now out of production.

The Arco 33 molds were later sold to Columbia Yachts and the design was developed into the Columbia 33 Caribbean in 1963.

Design
The Arco 33 is a recreational keelboat, built predominantly of fiberglass, with wood trim. It has a  masthead sloop rig or optional yawl rig with the addition of a mizzen mast. Features include a spooned raked stem, a raised counter transom, a keel-mounted rudder and a fixed stub keel with a retractable centerboard. It displaces .

The boat is fitted with a Palmer H-60  gasoline engine for docking and maneuvering.

See also
List of sailing boat types

Related development
Columbia 33 Caribbean

Similar sailboats
Abbott 33
Alajuela 33
C&C 33
Cape Dory 33
Cape Dory 330
CS 33
Endeavour 33
Hans Christian 33
Hunter 33
Hunter 33.5
Mirage 33
Nonsuch 33
Tanzer 10
Viking 33
Watkins 33

References

Keelboats
1950s sailboat type designs
Sailing yachts
Sailboat type designs by Wirth Munroe
Sailboat types built by Crystaliners Corporation